In mathematics, the Barnes G-function G(z) is a function that is an extension of superfactorials to the complex numbers. It is related to the gamma function, the K-function and the Glaisher–Kinkelin constant, and was named after mathematician Ernest William Barnes. It can be written in terms of the double gamma function.

Formally, the Barnes G-function is defined in the following Weierstrass product form:

where  is the Euler–Mascheroni constant, exp(x) = ex is the exponential function, and Π denotes multiplication (capital pi notation).

As an entire function, G is of order two, and of infinite type. This can be deduced from the asymptotic expansion given below.

Functional equation and integer arguments

The Barnes G-function satisfies the functional equation

with normalisation G(1) = 1. Note the similarity between the functional equation of the Barnes G-function and that of the Euler gamma function:

The functional equation implies that G takes the following values at integer arguments:

(in particular)
and thus

where  denotes the gamma function and K denotes the K-function. The functional equation uniquely defines the G function if the convexity condition, 

 

is added. Additionally, the Barnes G function satisfies the duplication formula,

Characterisation 
Similar to the Bohr-Mollerup theorem for the gamma function, for a constant , we have for 

and for 

Value at 1/2

Reflection formula 1.0

The difference equation for the G-function, in conjunction with the functional equation for the gamma function, can be used to obtain the following reflection formula for the Barnes G-function (originally proved by Hermann Kinkelin):

The logtangent integral on the right-hand side can be evaluated in terms of the Clausen function (of order 2), as is shown below:

The proof of this result hinges on the following evaluation of the cotangent integral: introducing the notation  for the logcotangent integral, and using the fact that , an integration by parts gives

Performing the integral substitution  gives

The Clausen function – of second order – has the integral representation

However, within the interval , the absolute value sign within the integrand can be omitted, since within the range the 'half-sine' function in the integral is strictly positive, and strictly non-zero. Comparing this definition with the result above for the logtangent integral, the following relation clearly holds:

Thus, after a slight rearrangement of terms, the proof is complete:

Using the relation  and dividing the reflection formula by a factor of  gives the equivalent form:

Ref: see Adamchik below for an equivalent form of the reflection formula, but with a different proof.

Reflection formula 2.0

Replacing z with (1/2) − z'' in the previous reflection formula gives,  after some simplification, the equivalent formula shown below (involving Bernoulli polynomials):

Taylor series expansion

By Taylor's theorem, and considering the logarithmic derivatives of the Barnes function, the following series expansion can be obtained:

Here,  is the Riemann Zeta function:

Exponentiating both sides of the Taylor expansion gives:

Comparing this with the Weierstrass product form of the Barnes function gives the following relation:

Multiplication formula

Like the gamma function, the G-function also has a multiplication formula:

where  is a constant given by:

Absolute value

It holds true that , thus . From this relation and by the above presented Weierstrass product form one can show that

If , then the below formula is valid instead:

for arbitrary real y.

Asymptotic expansion

The logarithm of G(z + 1) has the following asymptotic expansion, as established by Barnes:

Relation to the Loggamma integral

The parametric Loggamma can be evaluated in terms of the Barnes G-function (Ref: this result is found in Adamchik below, but stated without proof):

The proof is somewhat indirect, and involves first considering the logarithmic difference of the gamma function and Barnes G-function:

where

Taking the logarithm of the Weierstrass product forms of the Barnes function and gamma function gives:

A little simplification and re-ordering of terms gives the series expansion:

Finally, take the logarithm of the Weierstrass product form of the gamma function, and integrate over the interval  to obtain:

Equating the two evaluations completes the proof:

And since  then,

References

Number theory
Special functions